Mifflin is an unincorporated community in Chester County, Tennessee, United States.

Geography
The community is situated on Tennessee State Route 200 and the eastern end of Tennessee State Route 197.

History
Mifflin takes its name from Mifflin, Pennsylvania, the native home of a first settler. It is generally accepted that Mifflin was the first settlement in what is now known as Chester County. it was first settled about 1821 by Col John Purdy. Mifflin at that time was a part of Henderson County.

Mifflin is 16 miles from Jackson and 10 miles northeast of Henderson. Until after the Civil War, Mifflin was the largest town in present day Chester County.

References

Chester County Tennessee History and Families 1882 - 1995, Copyright 1995 Chester County Historical Society
 A Brief History of Chester County

Unincorporated communities in Chester County, Tennessee
Unincorporated communities in Tennessee
Jackson metropolitan area, Tennessee